Birmingham Erdington by-election may refer to:

 1936 Birmingham Erdington by-election
 2022 Birmingham Erdington by-election